Mycobacterium florentinum is a strain of bacteria found in humans that can cause infections and other disease conditions, and prolong sickness. It presents a high resistance to antimycobacterial drugs. It is characterized by: slow growth and a short helix 18 in the 16S rDNA.

Etymology: florentinum, of the Italian city of Florence, where the majority of the strains were collected and investigated.

Type strain
First isolated and characterized in Florence, Italy.  Strain FI-93171 = CCUG 50992 = CIP 108409 = DSM 44852

See also 
 Mycobacterial cervical lymphadenitis

References

Tortoli et al.. 2005.  Mycobacterium florentinum sp. nov., isolated from humans. Int. J. Syst. Evol. Microbiol. 55, 1101–1106.

External links
Type strain of Mycobacterium florentinum at BacDive -  the Bacterial Diversity Metadatabase

Acid-fast bacilli
florentinum
Bacteria described in 2005